Sotteville-sous-le-Val is a commune in the Seine-Maritime department in the Normandy region in northern France.

Geography
The A13 autoroute runs through the commune's territory.

Population

Places of interest
 The church of St. Baudèle, dating from the eleventh century.
 The seventeenth-century chateau of Val-Freneuse, with its chapel and park.
 A seventeenth-century manorhouse.
 A twelfth-century stone cross.

See also
Communes of the Seine-Maritime department

References

Communes of Seine-Maritime